The Men's 2022 European Amateur Boxing Championships were held in the Yerevan, Armenia from 23 to 30 May 2022. It is the 44th edition of this biennial competition organised by the European governing body for amateur boxing, the EUBC.

Schedule

Medal winners

Medal table

Participating nations 
219 boxers from 39 countries registered to compete at the 2022 European championships.

Belarusian and Russian boxers are not allowed to compete at the event after a ban as a result of the Russian invasion of Ukraine.

Due ongoing tension between Azerbaijan and Armenia, Azerbaijan decided not to send any boxers to 2022 European championships.

References

External links
Results book

European Amateur Boxing Championships
European Amateur Boxing Championships
European Amateur Boxing Championships
Boxing
International sports competitions hosted by Armenia
Sports competitions in Yerevan
Boxing